Tidjani is a given name or surname. Notable people with the name include:

 Sidi Ahmad al-Tijani (1737–1815), founder of the Tijānī Sūfī order
 Tidjani Anaane (born 1997), Beninese footballer

See also
 Tidjani Serpos
 Tijaniyyah